Battle of Swat may refer to:

First Battle of Swat (2007–2009), between the Pakistan Army and Taliban militants
Second Battle of Swat (2009), between the Pakistan Army and Taliban militants

See also
Battle of Swatow (disambiguation)